Calamari is squid as food.

Calamari or Kalamari may also refer to:
 The Mon Calamari (fictional race), fictional amphibious humanoids in Star Wars
 Vinicius Calamari, Brazilian footballer
 Kalamari (band), Slovene musical group
 Calamari people, a pre-Columbian indigenous ethnic group of the area that is now Cartagena, Colombia

See also
 Calamar (disambiguation)